Thomas Michael Maguire  is a Northern Irish public servant and former management consultant. Between July 2012 and July 2019, he served as the Police Ombudsman for Northern Ireland. He was previously the Chief Inspector of the Criminal Justice Inspectorate in Northern Ireland (2008 to 2012). Before moving into public service, he worked as a management consultant with PA Consulting Group and was a Director of Price Waterhouse.

Maguire was appointed Commander of the Order of the British Empire (CBE) in the 2019 Birthday Honours.

References

 

 

Living people
Ombudsmen in Northern Ireland
Businesspeople from Northern Ireland
Year of birth missing (living people)
British management consultants
Commanders of the Order of the British Empire